Sagar is an Indian actor who works in Telugu television. He is known for essaying lead role in Chakravakam (2006) and Mogali Rekulu (2008-2013). Sagar is a recipient of Nandi TV Award for Best Actor.

Personal life 
Sagar married Soundarya in 2017. The couple has a son.

Career 
Sagar has appeared in the television shows Chakravakam and Mogali Rekulu. He has rejected movie offers from popular production houses citing time issues majorly due to his commitments on TV.

The Telugu film Shaadi Mubarak, produced by Dil Raju, was released in 2021. He has signed a film under the production of screenwriter B. V. S. Ravi.

Filmography

Television

Awards and nominations

References 

Living people
Indian male television actors
Male actors in Telugu television
Male actors in Telugu cinema
Indian male film actors
Male actors from Telangana
Year of birth missing (living people)
Telugu male actors
21st-century Indian male actors
Nandi Award winners